Approximately 530 compositions have been attributed to Johann Pachelbel. , no standard numbering system exists for Pachelbel's work. This article presents a thematically organized list and provides catalogue numbers from three different catalogues:
 P = catalogue by Jean M. Perreault, 2001
 T = catalogue by Hideo Tsukamoto, 2002, available online (archive from 18 October 2014)
 PC = catalogue by Kathryn J. Welter, 1998
For organ works, POP catalogue numbers are provided, from catalogue by Antoine Bouchard for his 1998–2001 recording of Pachelbel's organ oeuvre (this catalogue only covers organ works). Perreault numbers are used as the basis of the list, making individual sections organized alphabetically (i.e. the chorales) and/or by tonality. Because the Welter catalogue does not provide incipits, many of the works with identical titles will share a single PC number (which is in such cases denoted by a question mark).

The following symbols are used:
 * denotes that the ascription of the piece is questioned
 ! denotes that the composition is, apparently, lost

Similarly to catalogues of works by most early music composers, Pachelbel's list of works remains perpetually incomplete as new works are regularly found.

Organ music

Chorale preludes

Pachelbel composed chorale preludes to the following hymns:

Chorale variations

Magnificat fugues

Chaconnes

Arias with variations

Preludes

Preludes and fugues

Toccatas

Toccatas and fugues

Fantasias

Fugues

Ricercars

Other keyboard music

Chamber music

Vocal music

Arias

Motets

Sacred concertos

Masses

Ingressus

Magnificats

Lost works

Chorale preludes

Chorale variations

Chamber music

Vocal music

Miscellany

Notes

References
Bouchard, Antoine. 1998–2001. Liner notes to: Pachelbel: The Complete Organ Works, 11 CD compilation. Dorian.
Perreault, Jean M. 2004. The Thematic Catalogue of the Musical Works of Johann Pachelbel. Scarecrow Press, Lanham, Md. 
Tsukamoto, Hideo. 2002. Archive of J.Pachelbel's Works, accessed 1 August 2009.
Welter, Kathryn J. 1998. Johann Pachelbel: Organist, Teacher, Composer, A Critical Reexamination of His Life, Works, and Historical Significance. Diss., Harvard University, Cambridge, Massachusetts.

External links
 Johann Pachelbel: a comprehensive list of his works, includes easy-to find concordance between the different numbering systems of his works, and also editions

Pachelbel, Johann, compositions by
Pachelbel